Gao Wenqian (born 1953 in Beijing) is the Senior Policy Advisor at Human Rights in China.

He was previously a researcher at CPC Central Party Literature Research Center, where he wrote the official biographies of Zhou Enlai and Mao Zedong after the Cultural Revolution. Gao witnessed killings by PLA soldiers on 4 June 1989 during the student protest at Tiananmen Square and was deeply moved by this experience. He emigrated to the United States in 1993, where he wrote  Zhou Enlai: The Last Perfect Revolutionary in 2007.

As a supporter of democracy in China, Gao believes that the Tiananmen Square protests exposed the Chinese Communist government's "illegitimacy" in governing China, and that the current economic system is responsible for China's social ills.

External links
 Zhou Enlai: A Tragic Hero? Gao Wenqian talks about his new book at the Center for Chinese Studies
Saint and Sinner   By        Peter Ritter

References

1953 births
Chinese biographers
Living people
People's Republic of China historians
Historians from Beijing
20th-century biographers
21st-century biographers
Columbia University people
Historians of the Cultural Revolution